Kim Hwa-Seung (김화승; born 22 June 1985 in South Jeolla) is a South Korean weightlifter. He competed at the 2012 Summer Olympics in the -105 kg event, but was eliminated when he could not register a lift in the snatch part of the competition.

References

South Korean male weightlifters
Olympic weightlifters of South Korea
Weightlifters at the 2012 Summer Olympics
1985 births
Living people
Weightlifters at the 2006 Asian Games
Weightlifters at the 2010 Asian Games
Asian Games competitors for South Korea
Sportspeople from South Jeolla Province
20th-century South Korean people
21st-century South Korean people